The February Revolution, known in Soviet historiography as the February Bourgeois Democratic Revolution and sometimes as the March Revolution, was the first of two revolutions which took place in Russia in 1917.

The main events of the revolution took place in and near Petrograd (present-day Saint Petersburg), the then-capital of Russia, where long-standing discontent with the monarchy erupted into mass protests against food rationing on 23 February Old Style (8 March New Style). Revolutionary activity lasted about eight days, involving mass demonstrations and violent armed clashes with police and gendarmes, the last loyal forces of the Russian monarchy. On 27 February O.S. (12 March N.S.) the forces of the capital's garrison sided with the revolutionaries. Three days later Tsar Nicholas II abdicated, ending Romanov dynastic rule and the Russian Empire. The Russian Provisional Government under Prince Georgy Lvov replaced the Council of Ministers of Russia.

The Provisional Government proved deeply unpopular and was forced to share dual power with the Petrograd Soviet. After the July Days, in which the Government killed hundreds of protesters, Alexander Kerensky became head of Government. He was unable to fix Russia's immediate problems, including food shortages and mass unemployment, as he attempted to keep Russia involved in the ever more unpopular war. The failures of the Provisional Government led to the October Revolution by the communist Bolsheviks later that year. The February Revolution had weakened the country; the October Revolution broke it, resulting in the Russian Civil War and the eventual formation of the Soviet Union.

The revolution appeared to have broken out without any real leadership or formal planning. Russia had been suffering from a number of economic and social problems, which compounded after the start of World War I in 1914. Disaffected soldiers from the city's garrison joined bread rioters, primarily women in bread lines, and industrial strikers on the streets. As more and more troops of the undisciplined garrison of the capital deserted, and with loyal troops away at the Eastern Front, the city fell into chaos, leading to the Tsar's decision to abdicate under his generals' advice. In all, over 1,300 people were killed during the protests of February 1917. The historiographical reasons for the revolution have varied. Russian historians writing during the time of the Soviet Union cited the anger of the proletariat against the bourgeois boiling over as the cause. Russian liberals cited World War I. Revisionists tracked it back to land disputes after the serf era. Modern historians cite a combination of these factors and criticize mythologization of the event.

Etymology 
Despite occurring in March of the Gregorian calendar, the event is most commonly known as the "February Revolution" because at the time Russia still used the Julian calendar. The event is sometimes known as the "March Revolution", after the Soviet Union modernized its calendar. To avoid confusion, both O.S and N.S. dates have been given for events. (For more details see Old Style and New Style dates) .

Causes 

A number of factors contributed to the February Revolution, both short and long-term. Historians disagree on the main factors that contributed to this. Liberal historians emphasise the turmoil created by the war, whereas Marxists emphasise the inevitability of change. Alexander Rabinowitch summarises the main long-term and short-term causes:
"The February 1917 revolution ... grew out of pre-war political and economic instability, technological backwardness, and fundamental social divisions, coupled with gross mismanagement of the war effort, continuing military defeats, domestic economic dislocation, and outrageous scandals surrounding the monarchy."

Long-term causes 

Despite its occurrence at the height of World War I, the roots of the February Revolution dated further back. Chief among these was Imperial Russia's failure, throughout the 19th and early 20th century, to modernise its archaic social, economic, and political structures while maintaining the stability of ubiquitous devotion to an autocratic monarch. As historian Richard Pipes writes, "the incompatibility of capitalism and autocracy struck all who gave thought to the matter".

The first major event of the Russian Revolution was the February Revolution, a chaotic affair caused by the culmination of over a century of civil and military unrest between the common people and the Tsar and aristocratic landowners. The causes can be summarized as the ongoing cruel treatment of peasants by the bourgeoisie, poor working conditions of industrial workers, and the spreading of western democratic ideas by political activists, leading to a growing political and social awareness in the lower classes. Dissatisfaction of proletarians was compounded by food shortages and military failures. In 1905, Russia experienced humiliating losses in its war with Japan, then during Bloody Sunday and the Revolution of 1905, Tsarist troops fired upon a peaceful, unarmed crowd. These events further divided Nicholas II from his people. Widespread strikes, riots, and the famous mutiny on the Battleship Potemkin ensued.

These conditions caused much agitation among the small working and professional classes. This tension erupted into general revolt with the 1905 Revolution, and again under the strain of war in 1917, this time with lasting consequences.

Short-term causes 

The revolution was provoked by Russian military failures during the First World War, as well as public dissatisfaction with the way the country was run on the home front. The economic challenges faced due to fighting a total war also contributed.

In August 1914, all classes supported and virtually all political deputies voted in favour of the war. The declaration of war was followed by a revival of nationalism across Russian society, which temporarily reduced internal strife. The army achieved some early victories (such as in Galicia in 1915 and with the Brusilov Offensive in 1916) but also suffered major defeats, notably Tannenberg in August 1914, the Winter Battle in Masuria in February 1915 and the loss of Russian Poland during May to August 1915. Nearly six million casualties —dead, wounded, and missing— had been accrued by January 1917. Mutinies sprang up more often (most due to simple war-weariness), morale was at its lowest, and the newly called-up officers and commanders were at times very incompetent. Like all major armies, Russia's armed forces had inadequate supply. The pre-revolution desertion rate ran at around 34,000 a month. Meanwhile, the wartime alliance of industry, the Duma (lower house of parliament) and the Stavka (Military High Command) started to work outside the Tsar's control.

In an attempt to boost morale and repair his reputation as a leader, Tsar Nicholas announced in the summer of 1915 that he would take personal command of the army, in defiance of almost universal advice to the contrary. The result was disastrous on three grounds. Firstly, it associated the monarchy with the unpopular war; secondly, Nicholas proved to be a poor leader of men on the front, often irritating his own commanders with his interference; and thirdly, being at the front made him unavailable to govern. This left the reins of power to his wife, the German Tsarina Alexandra, who was unpopular and accused of being a German spy, and under the thumb of her confidant – Grigori Rasputin, himself so unpopular that he was assassinated by members of the nobility in December 1916. The Tsarina proved an ineffective ruler in a time of war, announcing a rapid succession of different Prime Ministers and angering the Duma. The lack of strong leadership is illustrated by a telegram from Octobrist politician Mikhail Rodzianko to the Tsar on 26 February O.S. (11 March N.S) 1917, in which Rodzianko begged for a minister with the "confidence of the country" be instated immediately. Delay, he wrote, would be "tantamount to death".

On the home front, a famine loomed and commodities became scarce due to the overstretched railroad network. Meanwhile, refugees from German-occupied Russia came in their millions. The Russian economy, which had just seen one of the highest growth rates in Europe, was blocked from the continent's markets by the war. Though industry did not collapse, it was considerably strained and when inflation soared, wages could not keep up. The Duma, which was composed of liberal deputies, warned Tsar Nicholas II of the impending danger and counselled him to form a new constitutional government, like the one he had dissolved after some short-term attempts in the aftermath of the 1905 Revolution. The Tsar ignored the advice. Historian Edward Acton argues that "by stubbornly refusing to reach any modus vivendi with the Progressive Bloc of the Duma... Nicholas undermined the loyalty of even those closest to the throne [and] opened an unbridgeable breach between himself and the public opinion." In short, the Tsar no longer had the support of the military, the nobility or the Duma (collectively the élites), or the Russian people. The inevitable result was revolution.

Events

Towards the February Revolution
When Rasputin was assassinated on 30 December 1916, and the assassins went unchallenged, this was interpreted as an indication of the truth of the accusation his wife relied on the Siberian starets. The authority of the tsar, who now stood as a moral weakling, sank further. On  the Emperor dismissed his Prime Minister, Alexander Trepov. On   a hesitant Nikolai Golitsyn became the successor of Trepov. Golitsyn begged the Emperor to cancel his appointment, citing his lack of preparation for the role of Prime Minister. On  Mikhail Belyaev succeeded Dmitry Shuvayev (who did not speak any foreign language) as  Minister of War, likely at the request of the Empress.

The Duma President Mikhail Rodzianko, Grand Duchess Marie Pavlovna and British ambassador Buchanan joined calls for Alexandra to be removed from influence, but Nicholas still refused to take their advice.  Many people came to the conclusion that the problem was not  Rasputin.  According to Rodzianko the Empress "exerts an adverse influence on all appointments, including even those in the army." On 11 January O.S. (24 January N.S.) the Duma opening was postponed to the 25th (7 February N.S.). 

On 14 January O.S. (27 January N.S.) Georgy Lvov proposed to Grand Duke Nicholas Nikolaevich that he (the Grand Duke) should take control of the country. At the end of January/beginning of February major negotiations took place between the  Allied powers in Petrograd; unofficially they sought to clarify the internal situation in Russia.

On 8 February, at the wish of the Tsar, Nikolay Maklakov, together with Alexander Protopopov ..., drafted the text of the manifesto on the dissolution of the Duma (before it was opened on 14 February 1917). The Duma was dissolved and Protopopov was proclaimed dictator. On 14 February O.S. (27 February N.S.) police agents reported that army officers had, for the first time, mingled with the crowds demonstrating against the war and the government on  Nevsky Prospekt. Alexander Kerensky took the opportunity  to attack the Tsarist regime.

Protests 
By 1917, the majority of Petersburgers had lost faith in the Tsarist regime. Government corruption was unrestrained, and Tsar Nicholas II had frequently disregarded the Imperial Duma. Thousands of workers flooded the streets of Petrograd (modern St. Petersburg) to show their dissatisfaction. The first major protest of the February Revolution occurred on 18 February O.S. (3 March N.S) as workers of Putilov Factory, Petrograd's largest industrial plant, announced a strike to demonstrate against the government. Strikes continued on the following days. Due to heavy snowstorms, tens of thousands of freight cars were stuck on the tracks, with the bread and fuel. On 22 February O.S. (7 March N.S.) the Tsar left for the front.

On 23 February O.S. (8 March N.S.), Putilov protesters were joined in the uprising by those celebrating International Woman's Day and protesting against the government's implemented food rationing. As the Russian government began rationing flour and bread, rumors of food shortages circulated and bread riots erupted across the city of Petrograd. Women, in particular, were passionate in showing their dissatisfaction with the implemented rationing system, and the female workers marched to nearby factories to recruit over 50,000 workers for the strikes. Both men and women flooded the streets of Petrograd, demanding an end to Russian food shortages, the end of World War I, and the end of autocracy. By the following day 24 February O.S. (9 March N.S), nearly 200,000 protesters filled the streets, demanding the replacement of the Tsar with a more progressive political leader. They called for the war to end and for the Russian monarchy to be overthrown. By 25 February O.S (10 March N.S), nearly all industrial enterprises in Petrograd were shut down by the uprising. Although all gatherings on the streets were absolutely forbidden some 250,000 people were on strike. The president of the Imperial Duma Rodzianko asked the chairman of the Council of Ministers Golitsyn to resign; the minister of Foreign Affairs Nikolai Pokrovsky proposed the resignation of the whole government. There were disturbances on the Nevsky Prospect during the day and in the late afternoon four people were killed.

The Tsar took action to address the riots on 25 February O.S (10 March N.S) by wiring garrison commander General Sergey Semyonovich Khabalov, an inexperienced and extremely indecisive commander of the Petrograd military district, to disperse the crowds with rifle fire and to suppress the "impermissible" rioting by force. On 26 February O.S (11 March N.S) the centre of the city was cordoned off. Nikolai Pokrovsky reported about his negotiations with the Bloc (led by Maklakov) at the session of the Council of Ministers in the Mariinsky Palace. The Bloc spoke for the resignation of the government. 

During the late afternoon of 26 February O.S (11 March N.S) the Fourth Company of the Pavlovsky Reserve Regiment broke out of their barracks upon learning that another detachment of the regiment had clashed with demonstrators near the Kazan Cathedral. After firing at mounted police the soldiers of the Fourth Company were disarmed by the Preobrazhensky Regiment. This marked the first instance of open mutiny in the Petrograd garrison. On 26 February O.S (11 March N.S) Mikhail Rodzianko, Chairman of the Duma, had sent the Tsar a report of the chaos in a telegram (exact wordings and translations differ, but each retains a similar sense):

Golitsyn received by telegraph a decree from the Tsar dissolving the Duma once again. Golitsyn used a (signed, but not yet dated) ukaze declaring that his Majesty had decided to interrupt the Duma until April, leaving it with no legal authority to act. The Council of Elders and the deputies refused to comply in the face of unrest.

On the next day (27 February O.S, 12 March N.S),  the Duma remained obedient, and "did not attempt to hold an official sitting". Then some delegates decided to form a Provisional Committee of the State Duma, led by Rodzianko and backed by major Moscow manufacturers and St. Petersburg bankers. Vasily Maklakov was appointed as one of the 24 commissars of the Provisional Committee of the State Duma. Its first meeting was on the same evening and ordered the arrest of all the ex-ministers and senior officials. The Duma refused to head the revolutionary movement. At the same time, socialists also formed the Petrograd Soviet. In the Mariinsky Palace  the Council of Ministers of Russia, assisted by Mikhail Rodzianko, held its last meeting. Protopopov was told to resign and offered to commit suicide. The Council formally submitted its resignation to the Tsar.

By nightfall, General Khabalov and his forces faced a capital controlled by revolutionaries. The protesters of Petrograd burned and sacked the premises of the district court, the headquarters of the secret police, and many police stations. They also occupied the Ministry of Transport, seized the arsenal, and released prisoners into the city. Army officers retreated into hiding and many took refuge in the Admiralty, but moved that night to the Winter Palace.

Tsar's return and abdication 

Nicholas's response on 27 February O.S (12 March N.S), perhaps based on the Empress's earlier letter to him that the concern about Petrograd was an over-reaction, was one of irritation that "again, this fat Rodzianko has written me lots of nonsense, to which I shall not even deign to reply". Meanwhile, events unfolded in Petrograd. The bulk of the garrison mutinied, starting with the Volinsky Regiment. Soldiers of this regiment brought the 
, Preobrazhensky, and Moskovsky Regiments out on the street to join the rebellion, resulting in the hunting down of police and the gathering of 40,000 rifles which were dispersed among the workers. Even the Cossack units that the government had come to use for crowd control showed signs that they supported the people. Although few actively joined the rioting, many officers were either shot or went into hiding; the ability of the garrison to hold back the protests was all but nullified. Symbols of the Tsarist regime were rapidly torn down around the city and governmental authority in the capital collapsed – not helped by the fact that Nicholas had earlier that day suspended a session in the Duma that was intended to discuss the issue further, leaving it with no legal authority to act. Attempts were made by high-ranking military leaders to persuade the Tsar to resign power to the Duma. 

The response of the Duma, urged on by the Progressive Bloc, was to establish a Provisional Committee to restore law and order; the Provisional Committee declared itself the governing body of the Russian Empire. Chief among them was the desire to bring the war to a successful conclusion in conjunction with the Allies, and the very cause of their opposition was the ever-deepening conviction that this was unattainable under the present government and under the present regime. Meanwhile, the socialist parties re-established the Petrograd Soviet, first created during the 1905 revolution, to represent workers and soldiers. The remaining loyal units switched allegiance the next day.

On 28 February O.S (13 March N.S), at five in the morning, the Tsar left Mogilev, (and also directed Nikolai Ivanov to go to Tsarskoye Selo) but was unable to reach Petrograd as revolutionaries controlled railway stations around the capital. Around midnight the train was stopped at Malaya Vishera, turned, and in the evening of 1 March O.S (14 March N.S) Nicholas arrived in Pskov. In the meantime, the units guarding the Alexander Palace in Tsarskoe Selo either "declared their neutrality" or left for Petrograd and thus abandoned the Imperial Family. On 28 February Nikolay Maklakov was arrested having tried to prevent a revolution together with Alexander Protopopov (on 8 February).

The Army Chief Nikolai Ruzsky, and the Duma deputies Vasily Shulgin and Alexander Guchkov who had come to advise the Tsar, suggested that he abdicate the throne. He did so on behalf of himself and his son, Tsarevich Alexei. At 3 o'clock in the afternoon of Thursday, 2 March O.S (15 March N.S), Nicholas nominated his brother, the Grand Duke Michael Alexandrovich, to succeed him. The next day the Grand Duke realised that he would have little support as ruler, so he declined the crown, stating that he would take it only if that was the consensus of democratic action by the Russian Constituent Assembly, which shall define the form of government for Russia. The 300-year-old Romanov dynasty ended with the Grand Duke's decision on 3 March O.S (16 March N.S). On 8 March O.S (22 March N.S) the former Tsar, addressed with contempt by the sentries as "Nicholas Romanov", was reunited with his family at the Alexander Palace at Tsarskoye Selo. He and his family and loyal retainers were placed under protective custody by the Provisional Government in the palace.

Establishment of Dual Power 

The February Revolution immediately caused widespread excitement in Petrograd. On 3 March O.S (16 March N.S), a provisional government was announced by the Provisional Committee of the State Duma. The Provisional Government published its manifesto declaring itself the governing body of the Russian Empire that same day. The manifesto proposed a plan of civic and political rights and the installation of a democratically elected  Russian Constituent Assembly, but did not touch on many of the topics that were driving forces in the revolution such as participation in World War I and land. At the same time, the Petrograd Soviet (or workers' council) began organizing and was officially formed on 27 February. The Petrograd Soviet and the Provisional Government shared dual power over Russia. The term dual power came about as the driving forces in the fall of the monarchy, opposition to the human and widespread political movement, became politically institutionalized.

While the Soviet represented the proletariat, the provisional government represented the bourgeoisie. The Soviet had stronger practical power because it controlled the workers and the soldiers, but it did not want to become involved in administration and bureaucracy; the Provisional Government lacked support from the population. Since the Provisional Government did not have the support of the majority and, in an effort to keep their claim to democratic mandate, they welcomed socialist parties to join in order to gain more support and Dvoyevlastiye (dual power) was established.  However, the Soviet asserted de facto supremacy as early as 1 March O.S (14 March N.S) (before the creation of the Provisional Government), by issuing Order No. 1:

Order No. 1 ensured that the Dual Authority developed on the Soviet's conditions. The Provisional Government was not a publicly elected body (having been self-proclaimed by committee members of the old Duma) and it lacked the political legitimacy to question this arrangement and instead arranged for elections to be held later. The Provisional Government had the formal authority in Russia but the Soviet Executive Committee and the soviets had the support of the majority of the population. The Soviet held the real power to effect change. The Provisional Government represented an alliance between liberals and socialists who wanted political reform.

The initial soviet executive chairmen were Menshevik Nikolay Chkheidze, Matvey Skobelev and Alexander Kerensky. The chairmen believed that the February Revolution was a "Bourgeois revolution" about bringing capitalist development to Russia instead of socialism. The center-left was well represented, and the government was initially chaired by a liberal aristocrat, Prince Georgy Yevgenyevich Lvov, a man with no connections to any official party. The Provisional government included 9 Duma deputies and 6 from the Kadet party in ministerial positional, representing professional and business interests, the bourgeoisie. As the left moved further left in Russia over the course of 1917, the Kadets became the main conservative party. Despite this, the provisional government strove to implement further left-leaning policies with the repeal of the death penalty, amnesty for political prisoners, and freedom of the press.  

Dual Power was not prevalent outside of the capital and political systems varied from province to province. One example of a system gathered the educated public, workers, and soldiers to facilitate order and food systems, democratic elections, and the removal of tsarist officials. In a short amount of time, 3,000 deputies were elected to the Petrograd Soviet. The Soviet quickly became the representative body responsible for fighting for workers and soldiers hopes for "bread, peace, and land". In the spring of 1917, 700 soviets were established across Russia, equalling about a third of the population, representing the proletariat and their interests. The soviets spent their time pushing for a constituent assembly rather than swaying the public to believe they were a more morally sound means of governing.

Long-term effects 

After the abdication of the throne by the Tsar, the Provisional Government declared itself the new form of authority. The Provisional Government shared Kadet views. The Kadets began to be seen as a conservative political party and as "state-minded" by other Russians. At the same time that the Provisional Government was put into place, the Soviet Executive Committee was also forming. The soviets represented workers and soldiers, while the Provisional Government represented the middle and upper social classes. The soviets also gained support from Social Revolutionists and Mensheviks when the two groups realized that they did not want to support the Provisional Government. When these two powers existed at the same time, "dual power" was created. The Provisional Government was granted formal authority, but the Soviet Executive Committee had the support of the people resulting in political unrest until the Bolshevik takeover in October.

During the April Crisis (1917) Ivan Ilyin agreed with the Kadet Minister of Foreign Affairs Pavel Milyukov who staunchly opposed Petrograd Soviet demands for peace at any cost. Vladimir Lenin, exiled in neutral Switzerland, arrived in Petrograd from Zürich on 16 April O.S (29 April N.S). He immediately began to undermine the provisional government, issuing his April Theses the next month. These theses were in favor of "Revolutionary defeatism", which argues that the real enemy is those who send the proletariat into war, as opposed to the "imperialist war" (whose "link to Capital" must be demonstrated to the masses) and the "social-chauvinists" (such as Georgi Plekhanov, the grandfather of Russian socialism), who supported the war. The theses were read by Lenin to a meeting of only Bolsheviks and again to a meeting of Bolsheviks and Mensheviks, both being extreme leftist parties, and was also published.  He believed that the most effective way to overthrow the government was to be a minority party and to give no support to the Provisional Government.  Lenin also tried to take control of the Bolshevik movement and attempted to win proletariat support by the use of slogans such as "Peace, bread and land", "End the war without annexations or indemnities", "All power to the Soviet" and "All land to those who work it".

Initially, Lenin and his ideas did not have widespread support, even among Bolsheviks. In what became known as the July Days, approximately half a million soldiers, sailors, and workers, some of them armed, came out onto the streets of Petrograd in protest. The protesters seized automobiles, fought with people of authority, and often fired their guns into the air.  The crowd was so uncontrollable that the Soviet leadership sent the Socialist Revolutionary Victor Chernov, a widely liked politician, to the streets to calm the crowd. The demonstrators, lacking leadership, disbanded and the government survived. Leaders of the Soviet placed the blame of the July Days on the Bolsheviks, as did the Provisional Government who issued arrest warrants for prominent Bolsheviks. Historians debated from early on whether this was a planned Bolshevik attempt to seize power or a strategy to plan a future coup. Lenin fled to Finland and other members of the Bolshevik party were arrested. Lvov was replaced by the Socialist Revolutionary minister Alexander Kerensky as head of the Provisional Government.

Kerensky declared freedom of speech, ended capital punishment, released thousands of political prisoners, and tried to maintain Russian involvement in World War I. He faced many challenges related to the war: there were still very heavy military losses on the front; dissatisfied soldiers deserted in larger numbers than before; other political groups did their utmost to undermine him; there was a strong movement in favor of withdrawing Russia from the war, which was seen to be draining the country, and many who had initially supported it now wanted out; and there was a great shortage of food and supplies, which was very difficult to remedy in wartime conditions. All of these were highlighted by the soldiers, urban workers, and peasants who claimed that little had been gained by the February Revolution. Kerensky was expected to deliver on his promises of jobs, land, and food, and failed to do so. In August 1917 Russian socialists assembled for a conference on defense, which resulted in a split between the Bolsheviks, who rejected the continuation of the war, and moderate socialists.

The Kornilov Affair arose when Commander-in-Chief of the Army, General Lavr Kornilov, directed an army under Aleksandr Krymov to march toward Petrograd with Kerensky's agreement. Although the details remain sketchy, Kerensky appeared to become frightened by the possibility of a coup, and the order was countermanded. (Historian Richard Pipes is adamant that the episode was engineered by Kerensky). On 27 August O.S (9 September N.S), feeling betrayed by the Kerensky government, who had previously agreed with his views on how to restore order to Russia, Kornilov pushed on towards Petrograd. With few troops to spare on the front, Kerensky was turned to the Petrograd Soviet for help. Bolsheviks, Mensheviks and Socialist Revolutionaries confronted the army and convinced them to stand down. Right-wingers felt betrayed, and the left-wingers were resurgent. On 1 September O.S. (14 September N.S.) Kerensky formally abolished the monarchy and proclaimed the creation of the Russian Republic. On October 24, Kerensky accused the Bolsheviks of treason. After the Bolshevik walkout, some of the remaining delegates continued to stress that ending the war as soon as possible was beneficial to the nation.

Pressure from the Allies to continue the war against Germany put the government under increasing strain. The conflict between the "diarchy" became obvious, and ultimately the regime and the dual power formed between the Petrograd Soviet and the Provisional Government, instigated by the February Revolution, was overthrown by the Bolsheviks in the October Revolution.

Historiography 

When discussing the historiography of the February Revolution there are three historical interpretations which are relevant: Communist, Liberal, and Revisionist. These three different approaches exist separately from one another because of their respective beliefs of what ultimately caused the collapse of a Tsarist government in February.
 
 Communist historians present a story in which the masses that brought about revolution in February were organized groups of 'modernizing' peasants who were bringing about an era of both industrialization and freedom. Communist historian Boris Sokolov has been outspoken about the belief that the revolution in February was a coming together of the people and was more positive than the October revolution. Communist historians consistently place little emphasis on the role of World War I (WWI) in leading to the February Revolution.
 In contrast, Liberal perspectives of the February Revolution almost always acknowledge WWI as a catalyst to revolution. On the whole, though, Liberal historians credit the Bolsheviks with the ability to capitalize on the worry and dread instilled in Russian citizens because of WWI. The overall message and goal of the February Revolution, according to the Liberal perspective, was ultimately democracy; the proper climate and attitude had been created by WWI and other political factors which turned public opinion against the Tsar.
 Revisionist historians present a timeline where the revolution in February was far less inevitable than the liberals and communists would make it seem. Revisionists track the mounting pressure on the Tsarist regime back further than the other two groups to unsatisfied peasants in the countryside upset over matters of land-ownership. This tension continued to build into 1917 when dissatisfaction became a full-blown institutional crisis incorporating the concerns of many groups. Revisionist historian Richard Pipes has been outspoken about his anti-communist approach to the Russian Revolution.
"Studying Russian history from the West European perspective, one also becomes conscious of the effect that the absence of feudalism had on Russia. Feudalism had created in the West networks of economic and political institutions that served the central state... once [the central state] replaced the feudal system, as a source of social support and relative stability. Russia knew no feudalism in the traditional sense of the word, since, after the emergence of the Muscovite monarchy in the fifteenth and sixteenth centuries, all landowners were tenants-in-chief of the Crown, and subinfeudation was unknown. As a result, all power was concentrated in the Crown." — (Pipes, Richard. A Concise History of the Russian Revolution. New York: Vintage, 1996.)
 
Out of these three approaches, all of them have received modern criticism. The February Revolution is seen by many present-day scholars as an event which gets "mythologized".

See also 

 1905 Russian Revolution
 Nicholas and Alexandra, a biographical film of the Tsar and his family
 Russian Revolution
 Vladimir Lenin
 Women in the Russian Revolution
 World War I
 Index of articles related to the Russian Revolution and Civil War
 Bibliography of the Russian Revolution and Civil War

Notes

References

Bibliography 

 
 
 

 
 
 
 
 
 
 
 
 

Online sources

External links 
 Read, Christopher: Revolutions (Russian Empire) , in: 1914-1918-online. International Encyclopedia of the First World War.
 Melancon, Michael S.: Social Conflict and Control, Protest and Repression (Russian Empire) , in: 1914-1918-online. International Encyclopedia of the First World War.
 Sanborn, Joshua A.: Russian Empire , in: 1914-1918-online. International Encyclopedia of the First World War.
 Gaida, Fedor Aleksandrovich: Governments, Parliaments and Parties (Russian Empire) , in: 1914-1918-online. International Encyclopedia of the First World War.
 Albert, Gleb: Labour Movements, Trade Unions and Strikes (Russian Empire) , in: 1914-1918-online. International Encyclopedia of the First World War.
 Russian Revolutions 1905–1917
 Leon Trotsky's account
 Лютнева революція. Жіночий бунт, який знищив Російську імперію (February Revolution. Female mutiny that destroyed the Russian Empire). Ukrayinska Pravda

1917 in Russia
Nicholas II of Russia
Russian Provisional Government

March 1917 events
Dissolution of the Russian Empire